Alberto Barison (born 3 August 1994) is an Italian football player. He plays for  club Trento on loan from Südtirol.

Club career
He made his professional Serie C debut for Perugia on 5 January 2014 in a game against Nocerina.

He spent the next six season of his senior career in the third-tier Serie C, before advancing to Serie B with his club Pordenone for the 2019–20 season.

He made his Serie B debut for Pordenone on 26 August 2019 in a game against Frosinone. He started the game and played the whole match, also scoring the last goal in the 3–0 victory.

On 7 July 2022, Barison moved to Südtirol on a two-year contract with an option to extend for one more year. He did not make any appearances in the first part of the season, and on 12 January 2023 Barison moved on loan to Trento.

References

External links
 

1994 births
People from Dolo
Sportspeople from the Metropolitan City of Venice
Footballers from Veneto
Living people
Italian footballers
Association football defenders
Calcio Padova players
A.C. Perugia Calcio players
Ascoli Calcio 1898 F.C. players
Bassano Virtus 55 S.T. players
S.S. Arezzo players
Pordenone Calcio players
F.C. Südtirol players
A.C. Trento 1921 players
Serie B players
Serie C players